Toyland is a German 2007 short film directed and co-written by Jochen Alexander Freydank. It won the 2009 Oscar for Best Live Action Short Film.

Cast
 Julia Jäger - Marianne Meißner
 Cedric Eich - Heinrich Meißner
 Tamay Bulut Öztavan - David Silberstein
 Torsten Michaelis - Herr Silberstein
 Claudia Hübschmann - Frau Silberstein
 David C. Bunners - SS-Obersturmführer Falke
 Gregor Weber - SS officer Werner
 Jürgen Trott - Policeman
 Klaus-Jürgen Steinmann - Blockwart
 Heike W. Reichenwallner - neighbor
 Matthias Paul - Gestapo officer

Synopsis
The film is set in Nazi Germany in 1942. An Aryan family, the Meißners, and a Jewish family, the Silbersteins, are neighbors and friends. The respective sons in each family, Heinrich Meißner and David Silberstein, discreetly take piano lessons together. The deportation of the Silbersteins to a concentration camp is imminent, and when Heinrich asks why they may have to go soon, Frau Meißner does not tell Heinrich the truth. She instead invents a story that the Silbersteins will go to a new place called "Toyland". Heinrich says that when the Silbersteins go, he wants to go with them, so that he can still be with his friend David, which terrifies Frau Meißner.

The morning the Silbersteins are taken away for deportation, Heinrich is found missing from his room. His mother, Marianne Meißner begins to search for Heinrich. She encounters ridicule from Gestapo officers after she explains her situation, because they think that she is Jewish. However, after she shows her papers that prove that she is Aryan, they accept her story about Heinrich and assist in searching for him. The search continues until the last moment before the train with the Silbersteins on it must leave.

When the train doors are opened, Marianne calls out to Heinrich. The crowd moves aside and Marianne sees a boy she thinks is Heinrich hugging the Silbersteins, but instead it is David. A flashback shows that when the Silbersteins were taken away, Heinrich was not allowed to join them. Marianne realizes that Heinrich is not with them, but - to save his life - calls out to David as though he is Heinrich. The Silbersteins let go of him and all continue the ruse that David is Heinrich. David returns to the Meißners home where he is raised with Heinrich as their own son.

Production
According to Freydank, it took two years to secure financing for the production, whose costs totaled €30,000. The actors and production crew initially received no salary. Starting on 22 January 2007, the film was shot in 5 days in and around the Berlin area. Exactly one year later, on 22 January 2008, the film received its German premiere at the Saarbrücken "Film Festival Max Ophüls Preis". The nominations of the Academy of Motion Picture Arts and Sciences of the 2008 short subjects were announced on 22 January 2009, with Spielzeugland on the list. On 22 February 2009, Spielzeugland received the Oscar for Best Short Subject (Live Action).

Awards

2009
 Oscar for Best Live Action Short Film for Toyland
 Washington Jewish Film Festival, USA, audience award for Toyland
 Kansas City Film Fest, USA, best narrative short for Toyland
 Phoenix Film Festival, USA, world cinema best short for Toyland
 Pittsburgh Jewish Film Festival, USA, audience award for Toyland
 Hong Kong Jewish Film Festival, USA, audience award for Toyland
 Rehoboth Film Festival, USA, audience award for Toyland
 Villa Mare Film Festival, Italy, Publikumspreis for Toyland
 Reno Film Festival, USA, best foreign film for Toyland
 Portland International Film Festival, USA, audience award (second place) for Toyland
 Lenola Film Festival, Italien, best film + "best Soundtrack" for Toyland
 Shorts at moonlight, D, audience award for Toyland
 Anchorage Film Festival, USA, audience award for Toyland
 New Jersey Film Festival, USA, honorable mention for Toyland
 Cleveland International Film Festival, USA, audience award for Toyland
 San Diego Jewish Film Festival, USA, audience award for Toyland

2008
 Short Shorts Film Festival Tokio, Japan, audience award for Toyland
 Friedrich-Wilhelm-Murnau-Stiftung short film award for Toyland
 Bermuda International Film Festival, Bermuda Short Film Award for Toyland
 Rhode Island International Film Festival, second place International Discovery Award for Toyland
 Giffoni Film Festival, Italy, APEC Award in Gold for Toyland
 Alpinale Vorarlberg, Austria, audience award, for Toyland
 Odense International Film Festival, Danmark, best children and youth film for Toyland
 Alemeria en Corto, Filmfestival, Spanien, jury award & audience award for Toyland
 Los Angeles Jewish Film Festival, USA audience award for Toyland
 Palm Springs International Festival of Short Films, USA, audience award for Toyland
 Sedicicorto – International Film Festival Forli, Italy, Best short film for Toyland
 Asheville Film Festival, USA, Best short film for Toyland
 Victoria Independent Film Festival, Australia, Best short under 20 minutes for Toyland
 Festival Internacional de Cortometrajes de Almería, audience award- and jury award for Toyland

2007
 Semana Internacional de Cine de Valladolid|Valladolid International Film Festival, Golden Spike for Toyland

References

External links
 
 
 

2007 films
2007 short films
2000s German-language films
German drama short films
Live Action Short Film Academy Award winners
Films about Nazi Germany
German war drama films